Open Water is a novel by Caleb Azumah Nelson, published February 4, 2021 by Viking Press.

Personal background 

The year before Azumah Nelson began writing Open Water, his godfather, aunt, and three grandparents died. He spoke of his writing at the time, saying it "came about as I was trying to afford my grief, and in turn, myself, more form and detail. I didn’t want to feel so hazy anymore. So I was spending a lot of the time at libraries, gallery spaces, cinemas, concerts, trying to go past the level of knowing, towards feeling, and asking where those feelings come from. That’s a question which is written throughout Open Water. How do you feel?” 

Azumah Nelson continued, "There’s a level of vulnerability which love demands. To ask someone to see you is to ask someone to see all of you and trusting someone with all of you can be difficult. To see all this beauty and rhythm and joy but also to see your uglier parts, your pain, your grief. But it’s wonderful when it does happen, when you are no longer being looked at, but being seen.” 

The writer said "he had to make himself vulnerable to write it," much like the poet Morgan Parker says writers sometimes must "[dig] so deep you touch bone." Azumah Nelson said,  "I feel like I did this and then some. It is a joy to write but at times, quite heartbreaking. I guess, I’d love for readers not just to know what I’m saying, but to feel it too. The book is written in the second person so it’s very intimate, and in that way when a question is asked, I’m asking both myself and the reader. When I’m asking, How do you feel? That question comes both ways."

Reception

Reviews 
Open Water received starred reviews from Library Journal and Booklist, as well as positive reviews from Kirkus, The Guardian, The New York Times Book Review, Chicago Review of Books, The Wall Street Journal, The Irish Times, Los Angeles Review of Books, Washington Independent Review of Books, and Publishers Weekly.

As a debut, the book has been called "truly exceptional," "exciting, ambitious," "breathtaking," and "searing."

Guernica's Mary Wang applauded Azumah Nelson's writing, saying, "Open Water’s narrative moves like jazz, punctured with loops, diversions, and improvisation. The characters’ relationship is sketched through a series of images that emerge as quickly as they fade, as if tied to a rolling film reel."

Ploughshares' Brady Brickner-Wood provided a mixed review, noting that the book is "brimming with brilliant ideas and charming interiority," but it "struggles to temper its lyricism and narrative ambitions, resulting in a captivating if not uneven read." Despite criticisms, Brickner-Wood called Open Water "a moving novel that celebrates Black art and explores generational trauma."

TIME named Open Water one of the best novels of the year, and The Observer named it one of the top ten debut novels of the year.

Awards

References 

Viking Press books
2021 American novels
Novels set in London
Novels set in Dublin (city)